Knocknagree GAA is a Gaelic Athletic Association club based in the village of Knocknagree in the north-west of County Cork, Ireland.

Although approximately one mile from the border with Kerry, Knocknagree is officially in the parish of Rathmore with the majority of this parish in Kerry putting Knocknagree in front line when it comes to Cork-Kerry rivalry.

The club plays Gaelic football in the Intermediate grade in Cork after winning the 2017 Cork County Junior Championship for the 3rd time defeating Erin's Own in the final. 

The main pitch has been floodlit since 2006. In 2007 it hosted the first Duhallow Junior A Football Championship final to be played under lights. Ballydemond were victorious over Dromtarriffe on the occasion.

The club crest was designed in 2002 and features a horse's head in the centre, a traditional Irish fiddle (left upper corner), and an open book (right upper corner). A Blackwater bridge (with a leaping salmon) in the lower foreground symbolises the club's border location.

On 19 September 2015 Knocknagree bridged a 24 year gap to win their eleventh Duhallow Junior A Football Championship, beating Lyre GAA in a replay by a scoreline of 1-12 to 0-04.

Honours
 All-Ireland Junior Club Football Championship
  Winners (1): 2018
 Munster Junior Club Football Championship
  Winners (1): 2017
Cork Senior A Football Championship
  Runners-Up (1): 2022
 Cork Premier Intermediate Football Championship
  Winners (1): 2020
 Cork Intermediate A Football Championship
  Winners (1): 2019
 Cork Junior Football Championship
  Winners (3): 1984, 1991, 2017
  Runners-Up (3): 1979, 1982, 1989
 Cork Under-21 Football Championship
  Runners-Up (1): 1978
 Duhallow Junior A Football Championship
  Winners (12): 1966, 1978, 1979, 1981, 1982, 1983, 1984, 1989, 1990, 1991, 2015, 2016
  Runners-Up (9): 1940, 1962, 1968, 1975, 1977, 1980, 1988, 2014, 2017

Notable players

The following players have played for Knocknagree and have also played or coached at inter-county level with Cork.

 John Fintan Daly
 Eoghan McSweeney
 Niall O'Connor

See also
 Duhallow GAA

References

Gaelic games clubs in County Cork
Gaelic football clubs in County Cork